Grant Town is a town in Marion County, West Virginia, in the eastern United States. The population was 690 at the 2020 census.

The town was formed in 1901 with the opening of the Federal Coal and Coke Company bituminous coal mine, and was named for Robert Grant, vice president of the coal company.  The "Federal No. 1" mine remained open for the next 84 years until its closure in 1985. At one point it was the largest underground coal mine in the world in terms of gross production, mining the Pittsburgh coal seam. The town was incorporated as a municipality in 1946.

Grant Town is the site of an 80 Megawatt electrical generation facility, located adjacent to the coal refuse areas above the town.  The plant, which was built in the early 1990s is controlled by Edison International and generates electricity using a fluidized bed combustion boiler process burning waste coal.

The town is home to a local legend of a Bigfoot-type creature, sighted periodically by local residents since the early 1970s.  The creature, known locally as the "Grant Town Goon", is reported to live in the woods and coal waste areas to the southern and southwestern parts of the town.  Grant Town is also the location of a number of the stories of the West Virginia ghost story anthology The Telltale Lilac Bush, by Fairmont State University professor Ruth Ann Musick.  The town, the mine and surrounding farms are prominently featured in a number of the stories.  Musick includes a description of the town, circa 1965, in an introduction to a section on mine ghost stories:   "The Grant Town Mine, the scene of four of the stories here, is one of the largest in the United States, and possibly in the world.  The town itself, with a population of a little over a thousand, is about seven miles northwest of Fairmont.  Surrounded by hills, it is a kind of a sunken garden--a well at the bottom of the stairway of hills and highways--so that it seems to be in a world of its own.  In a way, perhaps, it is.  At least fourteen different European nationalities live in the town and work in the mine."

Notable people

Notable Grant Town natives include Charles Csuri, a pioneer in the field of computer art, former University of Arizona head football coach Rich Rodriguez, and Tom Wilson, creator of the comic strip Ziggy.

Geography
Grant Town is located at  (39.557358, -80.178485).

Demographics

2010 census
As of the census of 2010, there were 613 people, 260 households, and 171 families living in the town. The racial makeup of the town was 91.0% White, 7.3% African American, 0.2% Native American, and 1.5% from two or more races. Hispanic or Latino of any race were 0.5% of the population.

There were 260 households, of which 27.7% had children under the age of 18 living with them, 49.2% were married couples living together, 10.8% had a female householder with no husband present, 5.8% had a male householder with no wife present, and 34.2% were non-families. 29.6% of all households were made up of individuals, and 15% had someone living alone who was 65 years of age or older. The average household size was 2.36 and the average family size was 2.88.

The median age in the town was 41.8 years. 19.4% of residents were under the age of 18; 7% were between the ages of 18 and 24; 27.8% were from 25 to 44; 29.1% were from 45 to 64; and 16.8% were 65 years of age or older. The gender makeup of the town was 47.8% male and 52.2% female.

2000 census
As of the census of 2000, there were 657 people, 270 households, and 190 families living in the town. The population density was 1,199.3 inhabitants per square mile (461.2/km2). There were 316 housing units at an average density of 576.8 per square mile (221.8/km2). The racial makeup of the town was 90.87% White, 7.76% African American, 0.15% Asian, 0.30% from other races, and 0.91% from two or more races. Hispanic or Latino of any race were 0.46% of the population.

There were 270 households, out of which 27.0% had children under the age of 18 living with them, 52.2% were married couples living together, 12.6% had a female householder with no husband present, and 29.6% were non-families. 27.8% of all households were made up of individuals, and 18.5% had someone living alone who was 65 years of age or older. The average household size was 2.43 and the average family size was 2.95.

In the town, the population was spread out, with 21.8% under the age of 18, 8.7% from 18 to 24, 25.9% from 25 to 44, 23.9% from 45 to 64, and 19.8% who were 65 years of age or older. The median age was 40 years. For every 100 females, there were 85.1 males. For every 100 females age 18 and over, there were 80.4 males.

The median income for a household in the town was $24,722, and the median income for a family was $29,250. Males had a median income of $23,750 versus $22,083 for females. The per capita income for the town was $12,717. About 16.9% of families and 21.7% of the population were below the poverty line, including 38.3% of those under age 18 and 8.3% of those age 65 or over.

Notes

External links
 Picture of Federal No. 1 Mine from Pittsburgh and Lake Erie Railroad right-of-way commissioned series
 Recent Photograph of Remaining Coal Bin at Federal No. 1 Mine
 Aerial Photograph of the Grant Town Power Plant
 The Charles Csuri Project at The Ohio State University

Towns in Marion County, West Virginia
Towns in West Virginia
Company towns in West Virginia